Martignas-sur-Jalle is a commune in the Gironde department, Nouvelle-Aquitaine, southwestern France.

Population

See also
Communes of the Gironde department

References

Communes of Gironde